Gilbert Ignatius Sheldon (born September 20, 1926) is an American prelate of the Roman Catholic Church. He served as the third bishop of the Diocese of Steubenville in Ohio between 1992 and 2002. Sheldon previously served as an auxiliary bishop of the Diocese of Cleveland in Ohio from 1976 to 1992.

Biography

Early life 
Sheldon was born on September 20, 1926, in Cleveland, Ohio, one of 12 children of Ignatius Peter and Stephania Josephine (née Olszewski) Solinski-Sheldon. He received his early education at the parochial school of St. Phillip Neri Parish, and then attended Cathedral Latin High School In Chardon, Ohio 

Sheldon studied at John Carroll University in University Heights, Ohio, before beginning his studies for the priesthood at Saint Mary Seminary and Graduate School of Theology in Wickliffe, Ohio.  He earned a Master of Divinity degree from Saint Mary. Sheldon also received a Doctor of Ministry degree from the Ohio Consortium of Seminaries.

Priesthood 
On February 28, 1953, Sheldon was ordained a priest for the Archdiocese of Cleveland by Archbishop Edward F. Hoban. After this ordination, between 1953 and 1964, Sheldon served as an associate pastor at St. Rose's Parish in Cleveland, St. Clare's Parish in Lyndhurst, Ohio, and Saints Philip and James Parish in Cleveland. Sheldon served diocesan director of the Society for the Propagation of the Faith from 1964 to 1974.

From 1974 to 1976, Sheldon served as pastor of Sacred Heart Parish in Oberlin, Ohio and episcopal vicar of Lorain Count, Ohio. He also served as chaplain at Magnificat High School In Rocky River, Ohio, and of the West Park Knights of Columbus. Sheldon was a notary and prosynodal judge for the diocesan tribunal, instructor at St. John's College in Cleveland and member of the Board of Trustees for St. Mary's Seminary and for Borromeo College in Wickliffe, Ohio.

Auxiliary Bishop of Cleveland 
On April 12, 1976, Pope Paul VI appointed Sheldon as an auxiliary bishop of the Diocese of Cleveland and titular bishop of Taparura. He was consecrated on June 11 1976, by Bishop James A. Hickey, with then Archbishop Joseph Bernardin and Bishop Clarence G. Issenmann serving as co-consecrators. As an auxiliary bishop, Sheldon was named vicar for marriage and family concerns (1976) and vicar of Summit County (1978). In 1979, he became vicar of the Southern Region of the diocese, including Summit, Medina, Wayne, and Ashland Counties.

Sheldon was director of missions when the archdiocese sponsored a mission in El Salvador, then in the midst of an insurgency. On December 2, 1980, five members of the Salvadoran National Guard abducted, raped, and killed four American female missionaries in El Salvador. Two of the victims, Sister Dorothy Kazel and lay missionary Jean Donovan, came from the Archdiocese of Cleveland. 

Sheldon faced public controversy in 1984 when he asserted authority over the Bread of Life Community, a religious group that was accused of cult-like practices. After an investigation, he chastised the group for unequal treatment of female members and for its doctrines; the group's official ecclesiastical authorization was withdrawn in 1985.

Bishop of Steubenville
On January 28, 1992, Sheldon was appointed bishop of the Diocese of Steubenville by Pope John Paul II. As bishop, he presided over the newest and most sparsely populated of Ohio's six Catholic dioceses.

Retirement and legacy 
After reaching the mandatory retirement age of 75, Sheldon sent his letter of resignation as bishop of Steubenville to John Paul II.  His resignation was accepted by the pope on May 31, 2002. Sheldon was succeeded by Father Robert Conlon, a priest of the Archdiocese of Cincinnati.

See also
 

 Catholic Church hierarchy
 Catholic Church in the United States
 Historical list of the Catholic bishops of the United States
 List of Catholic bishops of the United States
 Lists of patriarchs, archbishops, and bishops

References

External links
 Roman Catholic Diocese of Steubenville Official Site

Episcopal succession

1926 births
Living people
John Carroll University alumni
Religious leaders from Cleveland
Roman Catholic Diocese of Cleveland
Roman Catholic bishops of Steubenville
American people of Polish descent
20th-century Roman Catholic bishops in the United States
21st-century Roman Catholic bishops in the United States